Horacio E. Esteves Orihuela Yaritagua, Yaracuy (6 July 1941 – 26 July 1996) was a Venezuelan sprinter who jointly held the 100 metres world record at 10.0s from 1964-8. His record time was run on 15 August 1964 at the Estadio Nacional de "El Paraíso" in Caracas (now Brígido Iriarte Stadium), matching the time set by Armin Hary in 1960 and Harry Jerome in 1962. He was also a record holder in the 100-yard dash, at 9.2s.

He reached the semi-finals in the 100m at the 1960 Olympics, and the same year competed in the heats for Venezuela in the 4 X 100 m relay. A muscle strain prevented him from going to the 1964 Tokyo Olympics. He did not go beyond the heats in the 1968 Olympics 100m. Esteves competed in the 4×100 metres Relay at the 1963 Pan American Games winning a silver medal with Arquímedes Herrera, Héctor Thomas, and Rafael Romero. He finished fourth in the 100 meters at the 1963 Pan American Games.

He went to high school at the Aplicación Lyceum and Luis Espelozín schools. He received a degree in physical education from the Instituto Pedagógico de Caracas (now part of the Universidad Pedagógica Experimental Libertador. He did an MA in science, specializing in Planning and Nutrition, and then studied physiology of exercise at the Universidad de Los Andes and growth and development at the Universidad Simón Bolívar.

References

External links
 

Olympic athletes of Venezuela
World record setters in athletics (track and field)
1941 births
1996 deaths
People from Yaracuy
Venezuelan male sprinters
Athletes (track and field) at the 1960 Summer Olympics
Athletes (track and field) at the 1968 Summer Olympics
Pan American Games silver medalists for Venezuela
Athletes (track and field) at the 1959 Pan American Games
Athletes (track and field) at the 1963 Pan American Games
Pan American Games medalists in athletics (track and field)
Central American and Caribbean Games gold medalists for Venezuela
Competitors at the 1959 Central American and Caribbean Games
Competitors at the 1962 Central American and Caribbean Games
Central American and Caribbean Games medalists in athletics
Medalists at the 1963 Pan American Games
20th-century Venezuelan people